Pullman is the largest city in Whitman County, located in southeastern Washington within the Palouse region of the Pacific Northwest. The population was 29,799 at the 2010 census, and estimated to be 34,506 in 2019. Originally founded as Three Forks, the city was renamed after industrialist George Pullman in 1884.

Pullman is noted as a fertile agricultural area known for its many miles of rolling hills and the production of wheat and legumes. It is home to Washington State University, a public research land-grant university, and the international headquarters of Schweitzer Engineering Laboratories.

History
In 1876, about five years after European-American settlers established Whitman County on November 29, 1871, Bolin Farr arrived in Pullman. He camped at the confluence of Dry Flat Creek and Missouri Flat Creek on the bank of the Palouse River. Within the year, Dan McKenzie and William Ellsworth arrived to stake claims for adjoining land. They named the first post office here as Three Forks.

Pullman was incorporated on April 11, 1888, with a population of about 250–300 people. It was originally named Three Forks, after the three small rivers that converge there: Missouri Flat Creek, Dry Fork, and the South Fork of the Palouse River. In 1884, Dan McKenzie and Charles Moore (of Moscow) replatted the site and named it for American industrialist George Pullman.

On March 28, 1890, the Washington State Legislature established the state's land grant college, but did not designate a location. Pullman leaders were determined to secure the new college and offered  of land for its campus. Idaho Territory had established its land grant college in 1889; the University of Idaho was to be in neighboring Moscow. On April 18, 1891, the site selection commission appointed by Washington's governor chose Pullman. On January 13, 1892, the institution opened with 59 students under the name Washington Agricultural College and School of Science. It was renamed the State College of Washington in 1905, more commonly known as "Washington State College," and became Washington State University in 1959.

In 1961, Pullman became a non-chartered code city under the mayor–council form of government. The city has an elected mayor with an elected seven-member council and an appointed administrative officer, the city administrator.

Geography

The city is situated across several loess hills which characterize the Palouse Prairie, formed from windblown sediment over an estimated period of over one million years. This prairie region, the Palouse, is noteworthy for its fertile rolling hills where winter and spring wheat, barley, lentils, and peas are grown. These hills provide a variety of elevations across the city, from 2342 to 2575 ft (714 to 785 m) above sea level. Downtown Pullman is situated in a valley between these hills. Within the Pullman city limits, the Missouri Flat Creek and Paradise Creek both join the South Fork of the Palouse River. Pullman sits in the watersheds of the Snake River and the Columbia River.

Pullman is situated across four major hills which divide the city into nearly equal quarters. These are:
 Military Hill, north of the Palouse River and west of North Grand Avenue
 Pioneer Hill, south of Main Street and the downtown area, and east of South Grand Avenue
 Sunnyside Hill, south of Davis Way and west of South Grand Avenue
 College Hill, north of Main Street and east of North Grand Avenue

Military Hill is named for the Pullman Military College that opened its doors in 1891 and burned down in 1893.

Climate
Pullman's climate is classified as dry-summer humid continental (Köppen Dsb), using the 0° threshold for mean coldest winter month; it nearly qualifies as having a warm-summer Mediterranean climate (Köppen Csb). This climate is typified by hot, dry summers followed by cold, snowy winters with short transitional seasons in between. Due to the rain shadow effect of the Cascade Range to its west, clear skies occur regularly throughout the year and rainfall is drastically less frequent in comparison to cities west of the mountains. Clouds of any variety are especially scant between June and September, which contributes to a diurnal temperature variation that is much higher during the summer compared to winter.

Demographics

In 2011, Bloomberg Businessweek selected Pullman as the "Best Place to Raise Kids" in Washington. Factors included affordability, safety, a family-friendly lifestyle, the quality of Pullman High School, the presence of Washington State University, and the natural environment of the area.

2010 census
As of the census of 2010, there were 29,799 people, 11,029 households, and 3,898 families living in the city. The racial makeup of the city was 79.3% White, 2.3% African American, 0.7% Native American, 11.2% Asian, 0.3% Pacific Islander, 1.9% from other races, and 4.4% from two or more races. Hispanic or Latino residents of any race were 5.4% of the population.

There were 11,029 households, of which 17.1% had children under the age of 18 living with them, 28.5% were married couples living together, 4.7% had a female householder with no husband present, 2.1% had a male householder with no wife present, and 64.7% were non-families. 34.5% of all households were made up of individuals, and 4.4% had someone living alone who was 65 years of age or older. The average household size was 2.18 and the average family size was 2.88.

The median age in the city was 22.3 years. 11.3% of residents were under the age of 18; 51.8% were between the ages of 18 and 24; 21.7% were from 25 to 44; 10.5% were from 45 to 64; and 4.7% were 65 years of age or older. The gender makeup of the city was 51.3% male and 48.7% female.

2000 census
As of the census of 2000, there were 24,675 people, 8,828 households, and 3,601 families living in the city. The population density was 2,740.8 people per square mile (1,058.6/km2).

The racial makeup of the city was:
 83.10% White
 8.48% Asian
 3.40% Mixed race
 2.40% African American
 1.58% from other races
 0.67% Native American
 0.38% Pacific Islander

Hispanic or Latino of any race were 3.86% of the population.

The 2000 Census found 9,398 housing units at an average density of 1,043.9 per square mile (403.2/km2). There were 8,828 households, out of which:
 59.2% were non-families
 33.0% were married couples living together
 31.1% of all households were made up of individuals
 20.0% had children under the age of 18 living with them
 5.8% had a female householder with no husband present
 3.7% had someone living alone who was 65 years of age or older (included in the 31.1% of households made up of individuals)
The average household size was 2.23 and the average family size was 2.87.

In the city, the population was spread out as follows:
 13.1% under the age of 18
 49.4% from 18 to 24
 22.8% from 25 to 44
 10.3% from 45 to 64
 4.5% who were 65 years of age or older.
The median age was 22 years. For every 100 females, there are 104.6 males. For every 100 females age 18 and over, there were 104.7 males.

The median income for a household in the city was $20,652, and the median income for a family was $46,165. Males had a median income of $36,743 versus $29,192 for females. The per capita income for the city was $13,448. About 15.3% of families and 37.5% of the population were below the poverty line, including 20.0% of those under age 18 and 3.6% of those age 65 or over.

Economy
Washington State University is the largest employer in both Pullman and Whitman County.

As part of the Palouse Knowledge Corridor, companies associated with an expanding high-tech industry are at the city's north end, anchored by Schweitzer Engineering Laboratories (SEL), the largest private employer in the region. The lab company was founded by Edmund Schweitzer, a Ph.D. graduate of WSU. SEL and other firms are within the  Pullman Industrial Park, run by the Port of Whitman County.

Pullman Regional Hospital opened on Bishop Boulevard in late 2004; its predecessor, Pullman Memorial Hospital, was on the WSU campus and shared facilities with the student health center.

Agriculture

Dumas Seed Company warehouse

Culture
Since 1989, Pullman has been home to the National Lentil Festival, a major community event celebrating the lentil legume grown in the surrounding Palouse region. The festival includes a lentil cook-off, Friday night street fair, Saturday parade and music in the park, and more. It is held in Reaney Park on the August weekend before fall semester classes start at WSU.

Sports

College sports are popular in Pullman; most support is centered on the Washington State Cougars who compete in the Pac-12 Conference in NCAA Division I. The football team plays at Martin Stadium, and their in-state rivals are the Washington Huskies with whom the Cougars play an annual rivalry game, the Apple Cup. The women's and men's basketball teams play at Beasley Coliseum, and the baseball team at Bailey–Brayton Field. Moobery Track hosts track and field, and historic Bohler Gymnasium (1928) is the home of women's volleyball. The challenging 18-hole Palouse Ridge Golf Club opened in 2008, an overdue upgrade of the nine-hole WSU course.

The Greyhounds of Pullman High School compete in WIAA Class 2A in District Seven. Historic rivals are the Clarkston Bantams to the south and the Moscow Bears, in adjacent Idaho.

Theatre
 Regional Theatre of the Palouse

Education
The Pullman School District consists of the following schools:
 Franklin Elementary School
 Jefferson Elementary School
 Sunnyside Elementary School
 Kamiak Elementary School
 Lincoln Middle School
 Pullman High School

The city's only public high school, Pullman High School (PHS) has about 700 students. It is on Military Hill. Its mascot for its athletic teams is the greyhound. PHS offers honors and advanced placement courses, along with Running Start course work through WSU and Spokane Falls Community College.

Washington State University

Pullman is the site of the flagship campus of Washington State University (WSU), a member of the Pac-12 Conference (Pac-12) in NCAA Division I. WSU is the second-largest university in the state of Washington, and is well known for its veterinary medicine, business, architecture, engineering, agriculture, pharmacy, and communications schools.

Transportation

Pullman is located near the junction of several major highways. U.S. Route 195 and State Route 27 travel north towards the Spokane area, passing through various towns in the Palouse, while State Route 270 follows the Bill Chipman Palouse Trail to Moscow, Idaho.

Horizon Air offers four flights daily from Pullman-Moscow to Seattle and four flights daily from Seattle to Pullman-Moscow. Shuttle service to Spokane International Airport is available. Major bus routes, including Greyhound, pass through Pullman. The city is also served by Pullman Transit, which provides bus service for residents and WSU students who do not live on campus. WSU students are able to ride without fares by presenting their student ID card, as the university includes a transit fee in tuition.

Notable people

 Pat Beach, NFL tight end for eleven seasons for the Baltimore and Indianapolis Colts, Philadelphia Eagles, and Arizona Cardinals 
 John Elway, Hall of Fame NFL quarterback for the Denver Broncos, was a resident for four years and attended Pullman High School as a freshman
 John M. Fabian, former NASA astronaut, graduated from Pullman High School and WSU
 Susan Fagan, politician. Member of Washington House of Representatives.
 William La Follette, U.S. Congressman, lived in Pullman
 Gary Larson, cartoonist, graduated from Washington State University in Pullman

 Timm Rosenbach, NFL quarterback for the Arizona Cardinals and New Orleans Saints; played at Pullman High School and Washington State
 James Mattis, former USMC general and the 26th Secretary of Defense
 Jean Hegland, novelist, born and raised in Pullman
 Ron C. Mittelhammer, former director of the School of Economic Sciences and former president of the American Agricultural Economics Association
 Kirk Triplett, three-time winner on the PGA Tour and member of the 2000 President's Cup team, 1980 graduate of Pullman High School
 Young Jean Lee, playwright, raised in Pullman

Notes

References

Further reading

External links

 

Primer: Pullman Washington : home of the State College of Washington, a 1911 publication about the city by Sunset Magazine

 
Cities in Washington (state)
Cities in Whitman County, Washington
Populated places established in 1875
Micropolitan areas of Washington (state)